John Francis Anthony "Jaco" Pastorius III (December 1, 1951 – September 21, 1987) was an American jazz bassist, composer and producer. He recorded albums as a solo artist and band leader and was a member of the jazz fusion group Weather Report from 1976 to 1981. He also collaborated with numerous artists, most notably with Pat Metheny and Joni Mitchell.

His bass playing frequently stylized funk, and employed lyrical solos, bass chords, and innovative use of harmonics. As of 2017, he was the only one of seven bassists inducted into the DownBeat Jazz Hall of Fame to have been known for his work on the electric bass, and he has been lauded as among the best bassists of all time.

Pastorius suffered from drug addiction and mental health issues and, despite his widespread acclaim, over the latter part of his life he had problems holding down jobs due to his unreliability.  In frequent financial difficulties, he was often homeless in the mid-1980s. He died in 1987 as a result of injuries sustained in a beating outside a South Florida after-hours nightclub.

Since his death in 1987, his work has continued to be widely influential. He was elected to the DownBeat Hall of Fame in 1988 and was the subject of the 2014 documentary film Jaco.

Biography

Early life
John Francis Pastorius was born December 1, 1951, in Norristown, Pennsylvania, United States. He was the oldest of three boys born to Stephanie, his Finnish mother, and Jack Pastorius, a singer and jazz drummer who spent much of his time on the road. His family moved to Oakland Park near Fort Lauderdale when he was eight. Early American abolitionist Francis Daniel Pastorius is his ancestor.

Pastorius's nickname, "Jaco", became adopted, and was partially influenced by his love for sports as well as the umpire Jocko Conlan. In 1974, he began spelling it "Jaco" after it was misspelled by his neighbor, pianist Alex Darqui. His brother called him "Mowgli" after the wild boy in The Jungle Book because he was energetic and spent much of his time shirtless on the beach, climbing trees, running through the woods, and swimming in the ocean. He attended St. Clement's Catholic School in Wilton Manors and was an altar boy at St. Clement's Church. His confirmation name was Anthony, thus expanding his name to John Francis Anthony Pastorius. He was intensely competitive and excelled at baseball, basketball, and football.

He played drums until he injured his wrist playing football when he was thirteen. The damage was severe enough to warrant corrective surgery and inhibited his ability to play the drums.

By 1968–1969 at age of 17, Pastorius began appreciating jazz and had saved enough money to buy an upright bass. Its deep, mellow tone appealed to him, though it strained his finances. He had difficulty maintaining the instrument, which he attributed to the humidity in Florida. When he woke one day to find it had cracked, he traded it for a 1962 Fender Jazz Bass.

In his teens he played bass guitar for Wayne Cochran and the C.C. (Chitlin Circuit) Riders.

Education
In the early 1970s, Pastorius taught bass at the University of Miami, where he befriended jazz guitarist Pat Metheny, who was also on the faculty. With Paul Bley and Bruce Ditmas, Pastorius and Metheny recorded an untitled album, commonly known as Jaco (Improvising Artists, 1974). Pastorius then played on Metheny's debut album, Bright Size Life (ECM, 1976). He recorded his debut solo album, Jaco Pastorius (Epic, 1976), with  Michael Brecker, Randy Brecker, Herbie Hancock, Hubert Laws, Sam & Dave, David Sanborn, and Wayne Shorter.

Weather Report
Before recording his debut album, Pastorius attended a concert in Miami by the jazz fusion band Weather Report. After the concert, he approached keyboardist Joe Zawinul, who led the band. As was his habit, he introduced himself by saying, "I'm John Francis Pastorius III. I'm the greatest bass player in the world." Zawinul admired his brashness and asked for a demo tape. After listening to the tape, Zawinul realized that Pastorius had considerable skill. They corresponded, and Pastorius sent Zawinul a rough mix of his solo album.

After bassist Alphonso Johnson left Weather Report, Zawinul asked Pastorius to join the band. Pastorius made his band debut on the album Black Market (Columbia, 1976), in which he shared the bass chair with Johnson. Pastorius was fully established as sole band bass player for the recording of Heavy Weather (Columbia, 1977), which contained the Grammy-nominated hit "Birdland".

During his time with Weather Report, Pastorius began abusing alcohol and illegal drugs, which exacerbated existing mental problems and led to erratic behavior. He left Weather Report in 1982 because of clashes with tour commitments for his other projects, plus a growing dissatisfaction with Zawinul's synthesized and orchestrated approach to the band's music.

Word of Mouth
Warner Bros. signed Pastorius to a favorable contract in the late 1970s based on his groundbreaking skill and his star quality, which they hoped would lead to large sales. He used this contract to set up his Word of Mouth big band, which consisted of Chuck Findley on trumpet, Howard Johnson on tuba, Wayne Shorter, Michael Brecker, and Tom Scott on reeds, Toots Thielemans on harmonica, Peter Erskine and Jack DeJohnette on drums, and Don Alias on percussion. This was the group that recorded his second solo album, Word of Mouth (Warner Bros., 1981).

In 1982, Pastorius toured with Word of Mouth as a 21-piece big band. While in Japan, to the alarm of his band members, he shaved his head, painted his face black, and threw his bass guitar into Hiroshima Bay. He was diagnosed with bipolar disorder in late 1982 after the tour.  Pastorius had shown signs of bipolar disorder before his diagnosis, but these signs were dismissed as eccentricities, character flaws, and by Pastorius himself as a normal part of his freewheeling personality.

Despite attention in the press, Word of Mouth sold poorly. Warner Bros. was unimpressed by the demo tapes from Holiday for Pans. Pastorius released a third album, Invitation (1983), a live recording from the Word of Mouth tour of Japan. As alcohol and drug problems dominated his life, he had trouble finding work and wound up becoming homeless. In 1985, while filming an instructional video (Modern Electric Bass), Pastorius told the interviewer, Jerry Jemmott, that although he had been praised often for his ability, he wished that someone would give him a job. However, the same year, he gave a much praised concert in Brussels (Belgium) with Toots Thielemans.

Death
On September 11, 1987, Pastorius snuck onstage at a Santana concert at the Sunrise Musical Theater in Sunrise, Florida. After being ejected from the premises, he made his way to the Midnight Bottle Club in Wilton Manors. After reportedly kicking in a glass door, having been refused entrance to the club, he became involved in a violent confrontation with a club employee who was a martial arts expert. Pastorius was hospitalized for multiple facial fractures and injuries to his right eye and left arm, and fell into a coma. There were encouraging signs that he would come out of the coma and recover, but they soon faded. A brain hemorrhage a few days later led to brain death. He was taken off life support and died on September 21, 1987, at the age of 35, at Broward General Medical Center in Fort Lauderdale. Pastorius was buried in Section L, Block 219, Grave 8 at Our Lady Queen of Heaven Cemetery in North Lauderdale, Florida.

The club employee faced a charge of second-degree murder. He pleaded guilty to manslaughter and was sentenced to twenty-two months in prison and five years' probation. After serving four months in prison, he was paroled for good behavior.

Legacy 
The legacy of Jaco Pastorius is one of the most impactful in the world of electric bass in jazz and in general for every genre, despite his flawed and controversial latter years,  although as time passed, his work began to be more appreciated by musicians. Known for his solo career with the self titled album Jaco Pastorius, the track "Donna Lee" is remembered as showcasing his incredible feel and speed on the electric bass, a level of skill which had not been seen before. In his contributions to Weather Report, he is remembered for his incredibly precise and fast bass lines, played with flash and gusto. The fact that he entered the music scene at the age of only 16 has inspired future musicians such as Victor Wooten. Jaco's legacy, while having some aspects that many find to be negative, overwhelmingly shows his unmatched skill and trailblazing in the world of jazz and electric bass performance.

He has a nephew David Pastorius.

Stage presence and bass techniques

Until about 1970, most jazz bassists played the upright bass, also known as the double bass. At the time, with few exceptions (such as the bass players in the trios Bill Evans led), bassists typically remained in the background with the drummer, forming the rhythm section, while the saxophonist, trumpeter, or vocalist handled the melody and led the band. Pastorius had other ideas for the bass player.  He played an electric bass from which he had removed the frets. He played fast and loud, sang, and did flips. He spread powder on the stage so he could dance like James Brown. He joked around and talked to the crowd. A self-described Florida beach bum, he often went barefoot and shirtless. He was tall, lean, and strong, and for someone who played sports the nickname "Jocko" fit. His thumbs were "double jointed" and his fingers were long and thin.

After being taught about artificial harmonics, he added them to his technique and repertoire. (Natural harmonics, also known as open string harmonics, are played by lightly touching the string at a fret while plucking the string, resulting in a note that rings somewhat like a bell. Artificial harmonics, also called false harmonics, involve fretting with the left hand as usual while using a finger or thumb of the right hand at the fret an octave higher, simultaneously playing and stopping the note.) An often cited example is the introduction to "Birdland".

He was noted for virtuosic bass lines which combined Afro-Cuban rhythms, inspired by the likes of Cachao Lopez, with R&B to create 16th-note funk lines syncopated with ghost notes. He played these with a "movable anchor" thumb technique on the right hand, anchoring on the bridge pickup while playing on the E and A strings and muting the E string with his thumb while playing on higher strings. Examples include "Come On, Come Over" from the album Jaco Pastorius and "The Chicken" from The Birthday Concert.

What was also so characteristic of Jaco was how he would play his music and bass lines with an incredible level of proficiency with not only the notes, but with the rhythm and feel of the music. Another characteristic of Jaco's playing was his use of the "octave technique" which is very often seen with slap bass. Jaco's use of the technique with fingerstyle was revolutionary at the time, since previously it had only really been used on guitars. This technique is seen on the tracks "Portrait of Tracy" from Jaco Pastorius and it is seen on "Birdland" from Heavy Weather. Another aspect of his playing was the heavy use of chromatic runs; these were played with immense speed and precision and became very characteristic of his style. These can be seen on "Opus Pocus" from  Jaco Pastorius,  and "Port of Entry" from Night Passage.

Equipment

Bass of Doom

Pastorius played a number of Fender Jazz Basses over the years, but the most famous was a 1962 Jazz Bass that he called the Bass of Doom. When he was 21, Pastorius acquired the bass, which was modified by removing the frets. It is unclear when the frets were removed, as his recollections varied over the years. One story is that he used a common butter knife to remove the frets, and sealed the fretboard with epoxy resin.

In 1986 the bass was repaired by luthiers Kevin Kaufman and Jim Hamilton, after it had been broken into many pieces. After the repair Pastorius recorded a session with Mike Stern, then the bass was stolen from a park bench in Manhattan in 1986. It was found in a guitar shop in 2006, but the shop owner refused to give it up. The Pastorius family enlisted lawyers to help but nearly went bankrupt in 2010. Robert Trujillo, bassist for Metallica, considered Pastorius to be one of his heroes, and he felt that the family ought to have the bass. Trujillo helped pay to have it returned to them, though he has used it live and is the custodian of it.

Fender began offering a fretless version of their standard Jazz Bass in the mid-1980s, and in 1999 began offering the "Fender Jaco Pastorius Jazz Bass" in their Artist series, and Custom Shop series. These instruments were modelled on the Bass of Doom, with the Custom Shop version featuring a fretboard sealed with epoxy resin. In the 2000s Fender's budget brand Squier offered the "Squier Vintage Modified Fretless Jazz Bass" which was also reminiscent of Jaco's instrument.

Since the 1980s other companies have offered fretless basses similar to, or modelled on, the Bass of Doom, such as Tokai and Edwards.

Amplification and effects
Pastorius used the "Variamp" EQ (equalization) controls on his two Acoustic 360 amplifiers (made by the Acoustic Control Corporation) to boost the midrange frequencies, thus accentuating the natural growling tone of his fretless passive Fender Jazz Bass and roundwound string combination. He also controlled his tone color with a rackmount MXR digital delay unit that fed a second Acoustic amp rig.

During the final three years of his life he used Hartke cabinets because of the character of aluminum speaker cones (as opposed to paper speaker cones). These provided a bright, clear sound. He typically used the delay in a chorus-like mode, providing a shimmering stereo doubling effect. He often used the fuzz control built into the Acoustic 360. For the bass solo "Slang/Third Stone From the Sun" on Weather Report's live album 8:30 (1979), Pastorius used the MXR digital delay to layer and loop a chordal figure and then soloed over it; the same technique, with a looped bass riff, can be heard during his solo on the Joni Mitchell concert video Shadows and Light.

Guest appearances
Pastorius appeared as a guest on many albums by other artists, including Ian Hunter of Mott the Hoople, and recorded a solo on the title track of his album All American Alien Boy in 1976. He can be heard on Airto Moreira's album I'm Fine, How Are You? (1977). His signature sound is prominent on Flora Purim's Everyday Everynight (1978), on which he played the bass melody for a Michel Colombier composition entitled "The Hope", and performed bass and vocals on one of his own compositions, entitled "Las Olas". Other recordings included work on four Joni Mitchell albums between 1976 and 1980 (Hejira; Don Juan's Reckless Daughter; Mingus; and Shadows and Light) and Al Di Meola's Land of the Midnight Sun, released in 1976. Near the end of his career, he worked often with guitarist Mike Stern, guitarist Biréli Lagrène, and drummer Brian Melvin.

Awards and honors
Pastorius received two Grammy Award nominations in 1977 for his self-titled debut album: one for Best Jazz Performance by a Group and one for Best Jazz Performance by a Soloist ("Donna Lee").  In 1978, he received a Grammy nomination for Best Jazz Performance by a Soloist for his work on Weather Report's album Heavy Weather.

Bass Player magazine gave him second place on a list of the one hundred greatest bass players of all time, behind James Jamerson. After his death in 1987, he was voted, by readers of Down Beat magazine, to its Hall of Fame, joining bassists Jimmy Blanton, Ray Brown, Ron Carter, Charles Mingus, Charlie Haden, and Milt Hinton.

Marcus Miller said "Jaco's composing was as unique as his playing."

Many musicians have composed songs in his honour, such as Pat Metheny's "Jaco" on the album Pat Metheny Group (1978), "Mr. Pastorius" by Marcus Miller on Miles Davis's album Amandla, and Rod Argent's "Pastorius Mentioned" on his 1978 album Moving Home. Others who have dedicated compositions to him include Randy Brecker, Eliane Elias, Chuck Loeb, John McLaughlin, Bob Moses, Ana Popović, Dave Samuels, and the Yellowjackets.

On December 2, 2007, the day after his birthday, a concert called "20th Anniversary Tribute to Jaco Pastorius" was held at Broward Center for the Performing Arts in Fort Lauderdale, Florida, with performances by the Jaco Pastorius Big Band and appearances by Randy Brecker, Dave Bargeron, Peter Erskine,  Jimmy Haslip, Bob Mintzer, Gerald Veasley, Pastorius's sons John and Julius Pastorius, Pastorius's daughter Mary Pastorius, Ira Sullivan, Bobby Thomas Jr., and Dana Paul. Almost twenty years after his death, Fender released the Jaco Pastorius Jazz Bass, a fretless instrument in its Artist Series.

He has been called "arguably the most important and ground-breaking electric bassist in history" and "perhaps the most influential electric bassist today".

William C. Banfield, director of Africana Studies, Music and Society at Berklee College, described Pastorius as one of the few original American virtuosos who defined a musical movement, in addition to Jimi Hendrix, Louis Armstrong, Thelonious Monk, Charlie Christian, Bud Powell, Charlie Parker, Dizzy Gillespie, John Coltrane, Sarah Vaughan, Bill Evans, Charles Mingus, and Wes Montgomery.

Discography

Further reading
Erskine, Peter. No Beethoven: An Autobiography & Chronicle of Weather Report. 2013, Alfred Music. Autobiography
Malone, Sean. A Portrait of Jaco: The Solos Collection. 2002, Hal Leonard. Bass transcriptions
Milkowski, Bill. Jaco: The Extraordinary and Tragic Life of Jaco Pastorius. 1995, Backbeat Books. Biography
Pastorius, Jaco. The Essential Jaco Pastorius. 2002, Hal Leonard. Bass transcriptions
Seligman, Adam Ward. Requiem for Orpheus. 1996, Echolalia Press. Poetry book
Uchiyama, Shigeru. Jaco. 2017, Published in Japan. Photo book

Notes

References

External links 

  – official site
 
 Pastorius family site
 Jaco Pastorius 1978 radio interview
 Jaco, a 2014 documentary produced by Robert Trujillo of Metallica and directed by Paul Marchand and Stephen Kijak. With Joni Mitchell, Sting, Flea, Herbie Hancock, Marcus Miller and Carlos Santana among others. Available for free on Tubi at Jaco (2015)
. A French documentary by Marc Renault, Chris Reynaud, François Loubeyre and Nicolas Clabault.

1951 births
1987 deaths
20th-century American bass guitarists
American jazz bass guitarists
American manslaughter victims
American people of Finnish descent
Blood, Sweat & Tears members
Jazz fusion bass guitarists
American male bass guitarists
Musicians from Fort Lauderdale, Florida
People from Oakland Park, Florida
University of Miami faculty
Weather Report members
Deaths by beating in the United States
20th-century American male musicians
American male jazz musicians
Trio of Doom members
Improvising Artists Records artists
People with bipolar disorder
Homeless people
Berklee College of Music faculty